Comitas lurida is a species of sea snail, a marine gastropod mollusc in the family Pseudomelatomidae, the turrids and allies.

Description
The fusiform shell consists of ten whorls. The angular whorls are crossed by delicate, spiral striae and longitudinal obtuse ribs. The whorls are tuberculated in the middle, the tubercles developing from more or less indistinct oblique folds or ribs, everywhere closely encircled by striae. The dark fulvescent shell shows a banded white zone that passes over the nodules upon the angle in the center of each whorl. The sinus is rather large.

Distribution
This marine species occurs in the East China Sea and in the South China Sea

References

 Adams A & Reeve L. Mollusca. Part 2. In: Adams A, editor. The zoology of the voyage of the H. M. S. Samarang; under the command of Captain Sir Edward Belcher, C. B., F. R. A. S., F. G. S., during the years 1843–1846. London: Reeve & Benham; 1850. pp. 25–41. pls 10–17
 Powell, 1969. The family Turridae in the Indo-pacific. Part 2: The subfamily Turriculinae; Indo-Pacific Mollusca, 2.10 (1969): 207-416.

External links
 
 Biolib.cz: Comitas lurida

lurida
Gastropods described in 1850